Support the Miners is a single released by American drummer Keith LeBlanc under the moniker The Enemy Within, released in October 1984 on Rough Trade Records. Similar to the re-issuing of No Sell Out the same year, Support the Miners was released to aid the miners strike in Great Britain, with the proceeds going to the "Miners Solidarity Fund". "Strike" features voice samples of Arthur Scargill, a trade unionist and former president of the National Union of Mineworkers.

Accolades

Formats and track listing 
All songs written by Keith LeBlanc
UK 7" single (RT 151)
"Strike" – 3:39
"Strike" (general mix) – 3:54

Personnel 
Adapted from the Support the Miners liner notes.
Keith LeBlanc – producer
Adrian Sherwood – producer

Charts

Release history

References

External links 
 

1984 songs
1984 singles
Rough Trade Records singles
Song recordings produced by Keith LeBlanc
Song recordings produced by Adrian Sherwood
Songs written by Keith LeBlanc
Political songs